WYLD (940 kHz) is a commercial AM radio station in New Orleans, Louisiana. The station is owned by iHeartMedia, Inc., and it broadcasts an urban gospel radio format, known as "Hallelujah 940"  Some Christian talk and teaching programs are also heard.

By day, WYLD is powered at 10,000 watts.  But because 940 AM is a clear channel frequency reserved for Class A XEQ Mexico City and CFNV Montreal, WYLD must greatly reduce its power at night to 500 watts to avoid interference.  It uses a directional antenna at all times.  The transmitter is off Tullis Drive in the Algiers district of New Orleans.

History
When it signed on in 1948, the station's call sign was WTPS.  It was owned by the New Orleans Times-Picayune daily newspaper and was a network affiliate of the Mutual Broadcasting System.  The call letters stood for Times-Picayune Station.

In the 1960s, it became WYLD.  WYLD was a successful Rhythm & Blues outlet in the 1960s and 1970s, serving New Orleans' large African-American community.  When it added an FM sister station in 1971, the urban contemporary format shifted to 98.5 WYLD-FM. The AM station evolved to a community-oriented R&B and Soul music sound in the 1980s to its current format in the 1990s.

On May 24, 2017, WYLD rebranded as "Hallelujah 940".

On April 27, 2020, the station began broadcasting in C-QUAM AM stereo using a new Nautel NX-10 transmitter, installed under the direction of then iHeartMedia Engineering Manager, Christopher Boone, WB5ITT. It is the only AM station in Louisiana currently broadcasting with the technology. It also uses MDCL, Modulation Density Carrier Level, during the daytime hours only.

Previous logo

References

External links

FCC History Cards for WYLD

WYLD
Radio stations established in 1965
IHeartMedia radio stations
Gospel radio stations in the United States
Christian radio stations in Louisiana